Resovia Rzeszów, formally known as Apklan Resovia Rzeszów for sponsorship reasons, and commonly referred to as Resovia; is a  professional Polish association football club from Rzeszów, Subcarpathian Voivodeship. It is part of the multi-sports club CWKS Resovia and is one of the oldest football clubs in Poland.

Among the achievements of Resovia's football team are: Championship of Lwów League in 1937, semifinals of the Polish Cup in 1981, and runners-up in the Second Division in  1983.

History

Resovia was officially registered in 1905 in the then Austrian Poland, but the history of the club dates back to several football teams, formed by students of local high schools in 1905–1907. As a result, in different sources the date of the foundation of Resovia is presented as 1905, 1907 and 1910. During World War I, when most of Austrian Galicia was occupied by the Russian Empire, the activities of Resovia were suspended. The organization was recreated in 1919, and in June 1920, first stadium was opened on Krakowska Street.

Resovia was formed as a football club, but in the 1920s, other departments were added (tennis, track and field, cycling). In 1932, volleyball team was formed, later the departments of boxing, table tennis and basketball were added. On February 12, 1933, Resovia was merged with football team of the 17th Infantry Regiment, which was garrisoned in Rzeszow. As a result of the merger, the organization changed its name into Wojskowo-Cywilne Towarzystwo Sportowe (WCTS, Military-Civilian Sports Association) Resovia.

In the 1930s, Resovia was among top teams of the Lwow Regional League (see Lower Level Football Leagues in Interwar Poland). It 1937, it won the regional championship, qualifying to the first round of the Ekstraklasa playoffs, where it faced Unia Lublin, Strzelec Janowa Dolina and Rewera Stanislawow. Resovia finished in the second spot, behind Unia Lublin.

The cooperation with the military ended in 1938, when Resovia received support from Rzeszów branch of the H. Cegielski – Poznań factory (currently: Zelmer Household Appliances). In 1938–1939, Resovia's official name was Sports Club H. Cegielski Poznań Resovia.

League history 
Resovia is spending now its 19th season in the second tier of Polish football clubs' pyramid and after 20 games it is placed 11th with 27 points.

Club names
 1909–1933: Cywilno Wojskowy Klub Sportowy Resovia
 1933: Fusion with KS Wisłok Rzeszów to Ogniwo Rzeszów
 1956–1967: CWKS Resovia
 1967: Fusion KS Bieszczady Rzeszów
 2003–2004: Resovia Cenowa Bomba Resgraph
 2004–2018: CWKS Resovia Rzeszów
 2018-currently: "Apklan" Resovia Rzeszów

Notable coaches
  Miroslav Čopjak (until 2010)
  Wojciech Borecki (interim, 2010)
  Artur Łuczyk (2010–2011)
 Szymon Grabowski (2017-2020)

Current squad

Out on loan

Staff
Head coach: Rafał Kroczek
Assistant coach Łukasz Tomczyk
Goalkeepers coach Mateusz Wójcik
Team coordinator Stanisław Mandela

Notable players
Internationally capped players

 Ilja Zítka

 Spirydion Albański
 Stanisław Baran
 Michał Benkowski
 Adrian Bergier
 Jarosław Białek
 Piotr Chlipała
 Piotr Codello
 Jan Domarski
 Konrad Domoń
 Łukasz Dzierżęga
 Oskar Fryc
 Sebastian Głaz
 Michał Iliński
 Witold Jakubowski
 Tomasz Jakuszewski

 Piotr Kamiński
 Łukasz Korab
 Kamil Kościelny
 Tomasz Król
 Marek Kusiak
 Damian Łanucha
 Bartosz Madeja
 Piotr Marynowski
 Dawid Mastej
 Łukasz Morawski
 Maciej Nalepa
 Jarosław Piątkowski
 Marcin Pietrucha
 Mateusz Podstolak
 Krystian Prymula
 Mateusz Siedlarz
 Paweł Ślęzak
 Waldemar Sotnicki
 Szymon Stencel
 Sławomir Świst
 Piotr Szalacha

 Mateusz Szyszko
 Rafał Turczyn
 Jakub Warchoł
 Mariusz Wiktor
 Rafał Zawiślan

 Pavol Húšťava
 Ján Krupa

 Chris Lonsdale

 Lubomir Ivanski

References

External links
 Official football team site
 Oficjalna strona SSA Resovii
 Oficjalna strona CWKS Resovii
 90minut.pl profile
 Facebook
 Twitter
 Instagram

 
Sport in Rzeszów
Lwów District Football League
Association football clubs established in 1905
1905 establishments in Poland
Military association football clubs in Poland